Sakon Nakhon may refer to places in Thailand:
the town Sakon Nakhon
Sakon Nakhon Province
Sakon Nakhon district